"Italy" is the two-part season five premiere of the American television sitcom Everybody Loves Raymond. Constituting the 98th and 99th overall episodes of the series, they were written by the creator Philip Rosenthal and directed by Gary Halvorson. In this episode of the show, which revolves around the life of Italian-American Newsday sportswriter Raymond Barone and his oddball family, his parents, Marie and Frank, announce that they're all going to Italy to visit the former's cousin Colletta, and everyone is excited to go except Raymond. Meanwhile, during the trip, Ray's brother Robert is attracted to a woman named Stefania, and tries to get past her father Signore Fogagnolo to meet her. With part one originally airing on October 2, 2000 and the concluding half on October 9, both on CBS, the episode has earned positive reviews from critics and received a Writers Guild of America Award.

Plot
Frank (Peter Boyle) and Marie (Doris Roberts) announce to their family that they're all going to Italy for two weeks. The latter reasons that with her birthday coming up, she is using the money she had kept aside for 45 years to pay for the family to meet her cousin Colletta (Silvana De Santis), who lives in a small village outside of Rome. Everyone is excited to go, except Raymond (Ray Romano). Ray informs Debra (Patricia Heaton) that he doesn't want to go on the trip because he has no interest in other cultures. Debra replies that she doesn't want his "dumbness" to ruin the vacation.

The family arrive at Colleta's home, who welcomes them along with her husband Giorgio. Ray begins developing a cold which he claims he got from the air conditioning on the van they rode. Robert (Brad Garrett), also becomes miserable, due to his "dilemma"; because he plans to marry Amy but keeps focusing on his ex-wife Joanne, he claims that he is unable to sort out his feelings. At a gelato parlor, he becomes attracted to a waitress named Stefania Fogagnolo (Alex Meneses), whose father Signore Fogagnolo (David Proval) is also the owner. He visits Rome with Stefania, but she tells him she doesn't want her dad to know she is dating. Meanwhile, Ray also goes to the city with the rest of the family, but while Debra, Frank and Marie are apparently having a great time, Ray is bored and unimpressed with the renowned sights, complaining they are decrepit.

After some time visiting Rome, Debra finally bursts out about Ray's attitude towards the trip and compares his behavior to Frank and Marie's; she argues that while his parents are at least trying to make the best out of things, he has been "a grumpy pain-in-the-ass". Angered, Ray tells her he "will not be a pain in anyone's ass anymore" and gets away from the three. Meanwhile, Signore Fogagnolo catches Stefania and Robert about to make out in her room, and goes after Robert. It also appears that the trip is starting to go downhill for Frank, Marie and Debra. Marie decides Ray should take a walk with her to lighten him up and release her stress from Debra's behavior towards him moping and not wanting to have fun. During the walk, he realizes that his cold has cleared up, and starts to become positive and enjoys the vacation.

At lunch, Robert, who confronts Marco again, decides to talk with him in Italian so he can convince him to be with Stefania. Meanwhile, Ray gives flowers to some of the women, including Colleta, Marie and Debra. Ray shows Debra that he is starting to enjoy the beautiful scenery and slower pace of Italy and interacting with the locals, which makes Debra happy, and the two go on their own date around Rome, as well and Marie and Frank. Colleta and Giorgio give a farewell to the family, while Robert and Stefania say goodbye to each other with Marco watching them. During the van ride, all the family members together sing "C'è La Luna Mezzo Mare".

The episode ends with Ray annoying his fellow passengers by singing loudly in Italian on the plane back to New York.

Production

After the first season of Everybody Loves Raymond ended in 1997, the series' creator, Philip Rosenthal, asked Ray Romano what he was going to do over the summer. When Rosenthal suggested he go to Italy, Romano did not accept because he was "not really interested in other cultures." According to Rosenthal, "After I got up off the floor, I realized: Here's an episode." Directed by Gary Halvorson, "Italy" guest stars Silvana De Santis as Colletta, Pierrino Mascarino as Giorgio, Alex Meneses as Stefania, David Proval as Signore Fogagnolo, Enzo Vitagliano as the Bocce player, Sergio Sivori, Vanni Bramat, Luca Francucci and Alessandro Francucci. It was filmed in July 2000 in the town Anguillara Sabazia outside of Rome. Romano first hinted of the episode in an interview published that same month in the Rome News-Tribune.

According to the Los Angeles Times, Brad Garrett threatened not to participate in the two-part episode unless he got a raise, which he was given.

Release and reception
"Italy" initially aired on the American television network CBS, part one on October 2, 2000 and part two on October 9. In 2005, it was released to DVD as part of the official DVD release for the fifth season, which also came with an audio commentary for both parts of the episode by Phil Rosenthal and Ray Romano. "Italy" has been positively received by critics. Former DVD Verdict writer Russell Engebretson said that while the episode "veers into sentimentality, it provides a dose of sweetness to counter a few of the more darkly comic episodes [of season five], especially the funny but bitter "Christmas Present." He also praised the impressive cinematography. DVD Talk's Jeffrey Robinson called it "a fun way to start the season. It was a nice change of pace after the same settings and atmospheres." He also highlighted the introduction of a new love interest for Robert. However, in a mixed review published in The Gadsden Times, David Kronke opined that in keeping with the nature of usual "special" episodes, "it's not quite up to the series' usual laugh quotient." On March 2, 2002, Rosenthal won the Writers Guild of America Award for Episodic Comedy for writing "Italy". He has cited the episode to be one of his favorites of Everybody Loves Raymond.

References

External links
"Italy" on Everybodylovesray.com: Part 1, Part 2
 (Part 1)
 (Part 2)

2000 American television episodes
Everybody Loves Raymond episodes
Television episodes set in Rome
Television episodes set in Italy
Television episodes about vacationing